Cenred of Wessex was a member of the House of Wessex and a member of the direct male line from Cynric to Egbert.  It is possible that Cenred ruled alongside his son Ine for a period. There is weak evidence for joint kingships, and stronger evidence of subkings reigning under a dominant ruler in Wessex, not long before his time.  Ine acknowledges his father's help in his code of laws, and there is also a surviving land-grant that indicates Cenred was still reigning in Wessex after Ine's accession.

His father was Ceolwald of Wessex. Cenred had at least three other children. 
 Ine, king of Wessex and married Æthelburg of Wessex
 Ingild, the great-grandfather of Ealhmund of Kent, and the great-great grandfather of Egbert
 Cuthburh, who married Aldfrith of Northumbria, and became abbess of Wimborne
 Cwenburh, who may have succeeded her sister as abbess at Wimborne.

See also 
 House of Wessex family tree

Notes

References

Primary sources
Ine's charters at Anglo-Saxons.net

Secondary sources

External links 
 

640 births
Year of death unknown
Cenred